William Henry Wyman (December 14, 1951 – June 19, 2013) was a collegiate American football player.  He attended the University of Texas at Austin and played at the center position for the Texas Longhorns football team from 1971 to 1973.  He was a consensus first-team selection to the 1973 College Football All-America Team.  He has been called "the anchor of Darrell Royal's final Southwest Conference championship teams."  He was drafted by the New York Jets in the 6th round of the 1974 NFL Draft. In 1974 training camp he competed with Warren Koegel to be the Jets' backup center but left camp a couple of times.  He was cut by the Jets before the start of the regular season. He tried out with the Washington Redskins during their 1975 training camp but was cut before the season began. He suffered from Parkinson's disease starting in approximately 1995 and died in June 2013.

References

1951 births
2013 deaths
All-American college football players
American football centers
Texas Longhorns football players
Players of American football from Texas
Neurological disease deaths in the United States
Deaths from Parkinson's disease